WinOps (a portmanteau of "Windows" and "DevOps") is a term used referring to the cultural movement of DevOps practices for a Microsoft-centric view. It emphasizes the use of the cloud, automation and integrating development and IT operations into one fluid method on the Windows platform.

Etymology 
The term 'WinOps' was coined at the London DevOps meetup held at Facebook in June 2015. As an amalgamation of Windows and DevOps, it represents the new emphasis on using existing DevOps methodologies in the traditionally less open-source Microsoft space.

Community 
Since the first WinOps conference in September 2015, there have been multiple meetups and a second conference which was held in May 2016. The WinOps meetup group has an active community with over 1,000 members. Their motto is "Windows in a DevOps World". They focus on shared experiences using Windows centred products and tools for establishing DevOps goals.

The Linux challenge 
Windows and Linux are very different; not just technologically, but philosophically. Tools are a major component to establishing DevOps, and the lack of Windows-centric tools limited early Windows DevOps adoptions as most initial supporting technologies emerged from Linux and open-source communities. WinOps boils down to addressing the same challenges as DevOps, using different tools.

WinOps-focused tools

References 

Agile software development
Microsoft culture
Software_development_process